George Troup may refer to:

 George Troup (1780–1856), American politician from the U.S. state of Georgia
 George Troup (architect) (1863–1941), New Zealand architect and statesman
 George Troup (journalist) (1821–1879), Scottish newspaper editor